Tyler Mizoguchi (born November 14, 1989) is a gymnast from University of Illinois who specializes in Men’s All Around. He was an NCAA All-American for the 2010 and 2011 seasons and has a career high seven individual titles.  In his freshman year, he placed first overall on the parallel bars at the Big Ten Championships.  He has also placed second on the pommel horse (score was 14.650) and second in the all-around (score was 84.800) against Penn State.  He currently resides in Champaign, Illinois and spends his summer in his hometown of Houston, Texas.
He attended Taylor High School and competed in gymnastics throughout his time there.  He was a member of the Houston Gymnastics Academy, which was coached by Kevin Mazeika, who was the 2004 and 2008 USA Olympic coach.  In 2006, he was the Texas state runner-up in floor and the Texas State Champion in Still Rings.  The next season, in 2007, he won Texas State Champion in pommel horse and All Around.

Media
He has appeared in many videos on the internet.  Most are of competitions he has competed in and finished well.  He appears in a video on gymnastike.com as well as stickitmedia.com and has been mentioned in Illini HQ.

Biography
Born Tyler Hideo Mizoguchi, son of Hideo and Kellie Mizoguchi. Tyler has one stepbrother, Kyle Kavanagh, and one stepsister, Krista Kavanagh.  In his youth and high school, he participated in both gymnastics and track and field, but grew to love gymnastics and pursued it with a vigorous appetite and great work.
His skills in gymnastics began to greatly improve around the time when he was in Junior high school.  His favorite events being floor and rings he aspired to one day be a part of the USA Olympic team.  He gained the ability to throw a full at the age of 12 and was soon able to complete many advanced skills on the floor exercise of tumbling.  When he was attending junior high school and high school he had a light enough body to compete well in the Rings and won many competitions.
In college he has achieved much already despite being only in his second year of completion. In his first year of competition he helped the University of Illinois to gain their second straight Big Ten Championship title.  Here he competed in the parallel bars, Pommel Horse, Floor Exercise, and in the All Around.  When competing in the parallel bars he got a score of 15.15 and placed first in his freshmen year at the Big Ten Championships.  He finished in sixth place on the floor exercise at the Big Ten individual event finals with a score of 14.725. In the Pommel Horse event he scored a 14.650 and in the All Around 84.800 against Penn State.
In his sophomore year he earned his first All-American honors with a sixth place finish in the All Around.  When he competed in the 2010 winter cup in early February, he placed well enough to make the United States Senior National team for the first time in his life.  Throughout the 2010–2011 season he gained a career high seven individual titles while helping the University of Illinois gymnastics team to win match after match along with other renowned athletes such as Daniel Ribeiro, Justin Spring and Yoshi Mori.
In his junior season he has continued his trend of competing strongly in competitions and has helped the University of Illinois to win the Big Ten Championships for a third straight time.  He is hopeful that his fourth and final season at the University of Illinois will be just as intense and full of wins in the hopes of competing on the United States Olympic team.

Personal
He lists Sean Golden as the most influential person in his life because Tyler said he has taught him many life lessons. His favorite athlete is Jordan Jotchev because he says that no matter how old he gets, he never gives up and now holds the record for attending the most Olympic Games.  Tyler’s biggest thrill in sports is seeing something that has never been done before. He loves to learn new skills and perfect the ones he has attained.

Personal bests

Achievements

References

External links
 http://www.gymnastike.org/video/485066-NCAA-Mens-Gymnastics-Event-FinalsTyler-Mizoguchi-Parallel-Bars-2011

1989 births
Living people
American male artistic gymnasts
Gymnasts at the 2011 Pan American Games
Illinois Fighting Illini men's gymnasts
Pan American Games bronze medalists for the United States
Pan American Games medalists in gymnastics
Medalists at the 2011 Pan American Games